Can't Buy My Love is the second album of Japanese singer and songwriter Yui. The album was released 4 April 2007 under Sony Music Japan label. The album title, Can't Buy My Love's message is "Ai suru mono wa kantan ni wa yuzurenai" (愛する ものは 簡単には 譲れない) which means in English "I can't easily hand over things that I adore."

This album reached #1 rank weekly, charted for 74 weeks and sold more than 680,000 copies.

Track listing 
Regular Edition

Limited Edition

Charts and sales

Oricon sales charts (Japan)

References

Yui (singer) albums
2007 albums
Sony Music Entertainment Japan albums
Japanese-language albums